Per Thomas Rundqvist (born 4 May 1960 in Vimmerby, Sweden) is a retired Swedish professional ice hockey player and now sporting director of Färjestads BK.

Rundqvist started his senior ice hockey career in 1978 with the Swedish club Färjestads BK. He played with the club until 1984, when he crossed the Atlantic and signed with the Montreal Canadiens (who had drafted him in 1983 (10th round, 198th pick overall)).
But Rundqvist played only two games with the Canadiens in the 1984–85 season, the rest of the year he played with Sherbrooke Canadiens in the AHL. So after only one year he went back to Sweden and Färjestad. He played six more season with them, but in 1993 he and his teammate in Färjestad Bengt-Åke Gustafsson signed for the Austrian team Feldkirch VEU. Rundqvist played there for five years and ended his career in 1998. Now (2006) he is working in the Färjestads BK's organisation.

Färjestads BK has retired Rundqvist's jersey number, #9.

Achievements
 Swedish Championship winner: 3 (1981, 1986, 1988)
 Austrian Championship winner: 5 (1994, 1995, 1996, 1997, 1998)
 World Championships winner: 2 (1987, 1991)
 World Championships second place: 3 (1986, 1990, 1993)
 Olympic bronze medal: 2 (1984, 1988)
 Canada Cup third place: 2 (1987, 1991)

Career statistics

Regular season and playoffs

International

References

External links

Swedish Olympic Committee Bio
Viking Award

1960 births
Living people
Färjestad BK players
Ice hockey players at the 1984 Winter Olympics
Ice hockey players at the 1988 Winter Olympics
Ice hockey players at the 1992 Winter Olympics
Ice hockey players with retired numbers
IIHF Hall of Fame inductees
Medalists at the 1984 Winter Olympics
Montreal Canadiens draft picks
Montreal Canadiens players
Olympic bronze medalists for Sweden
Olympic ice hockey players of Sweden
Olympic medalists in ice hockey
People from Vimmerby Municipality
Sherbrooke Canadiens players
Swedish ice hockey centres
Medalists at the 1988 Winter Olympics
Sportspeople from Kalmar County